Alene Nikolayev is an ethnic Bulgarian civic society leader born in Transnistria. She heads the Tiraspol-based Union of Bulgarians in Transnistria, also known as the "Historical and Human Rights Center of Bulgaria" in Transnistria.

References

Bulgarian activists
Living people
Bessarabian Bulgarians
Year of birth missing (living people)
Place of birth missing (living people)